Petrovski is a Macedonian surname meaning 'grandson of Petar' and may refer to:

Filip Petrovski (b. 1972), Macedonian political activist
Pande Petrovski (1943–2006), Macedonian military figure
Sasho Petrovski (b. 1975), Australian footballer
Vladimir Petrovski – Karter (fl. 1970s–1980s), Macedonian musician
Peter Petrovski - Galabalabovski (b. 1957), Former Macedonian politician

Macedonian-language surnames